Interstate Commerce Commission v. Cincinnati, New Orleans and Texas Pacific Railway Co., 167 U.S. 479 (1897), was an important early U.S. Supreme Court case in the development of American administrative law.

Background

Legal principle
The power of an administrative agency is executive and administrative, but not legislative.  The scope of authority held by an agency is determined by the agency's organic statute.  Where an administrative agency wishes to assume the traditionally legislative power to make policy, the power must be expressly granted by the agency's organic statute, and not implied from other terms of the statute.  This principle applies especially where the policy involves issues of great consequence.

Note: This principle was later qualified by cases such as NBC v. US which provided for more expansive powers for administrative agencies.

Facts and procedural posture
The ICC set rates for rail transport, and issued an order requiring all rail companies who charged more than the set rates to cease operations.  The ICC then went to the 6th Circuit Court of Appeals to seek a legal injunction requiring the Cincinnati, New Orleans and Texas Pacific Railway to comply with the order.  The 6th circuit sent a certified question to the US Supreme Court, asking:
Had the interstate commerce commission jurisdictional power to make the order hereinbefore set forth; all proceedings preceding said order being due and regular, so far as procedure is concerned?

Ultimately, the Supreme Court determined that the ICC had no such power.

Opinion of the Court
The ICC's authority stemmed from the Interstate Commerce Act, the organic statute which gave the ICC life, and determined the extent of its powers.  The Court considered two possible ways that Congress might vest the power to set rates in the ICC: expressly in the statute, or implied from the terms of the statute.

The Court found first that nowhere in the statute is the ICC expressly given power to set rates.

The issue of implied power also required consideration.  The ICC asserted that the power should be implied from the first section, which provided that "all charges ... should be reasonable and just; and every unjust and unreasonable charge for such serve is prohibited and declared to be unlawful."  The ICC deduced that if all charges must be reasonable, and Congress had not determined what was reasonable, then the ICC must determine which rates are reasonable, in order to perform its legal obligation to ensure that all rates would be reasonable and just.  Therefore, they argued, the only reasonable interpretation of the statute was that Congress intended them to exercise the power to set rates.

The Court rejected this argument, holding that the powers granted by the terms of the statute were solely executive and administrative, but not legislative.  As such, without an explicit grant of the power to set rates by Congress, the ICC was not permitted to set rates for rail transport.

References

External links

1897 in United States case law
United States Supreme Court cases
United States Supreme Court cases of the Fuller Court
United States administrative case law
v. Cincinnati, New Orleans and Texas Pacific Railway Co.
Railway litigation in 1897
Predecessors of the Southern Railway (U.S.)